The Shamrock Shake is a seasonal green mint flavored milkshake dessert sold at some McDonald's restaurants during March to celebrate St. Patrick's Day in the US, Canada and Ireland.

Origin 
The Shamrock Shake was first introduced in 1970. Rogers Merchandising in Chicago created the shake. Initially, the shake was lemon/lime flavored with vanilla ice cream, lemon/lime sherbet, and vanilla syrup. By 1973, the shake was merely a green colored vanilla shake, eliminating the lemon/lime sherbet. It is now mint flavored.

Shamrock Shakes are sold at select U.S. and Canadian stores during the months of February and March, as well as in Ireland.

Advertising 
During the 1980s, McDonald’s used the Uncle O'Grimacey character (a relative of Grimace who came to visit in March) to market Shamrock Shakes. McDonald's has since phased out that character from their mascot lineup.

In 1980, McDonald's introduced the Shamrock Sundae which consisted of vanilla ice cream topped with a mint green Shamrock syrup. The product was discontinued after one year due to poor sales.

In 2017 McDonald's introduced a few variants of the Shamrock Shake including the Shamrock Chocolate Shake, the Shamrock Chocolate Chip Frappé, the Shamrock Mocha, and the Shamrock Hot Chocolate.

References

External links

McCafé Shamrock Shake official nutrition page

Products introduced in 1970
McDonald's foods
Saint Patrick's Day food
Cold drinks
Flavored milk
Non-alcoholic drinks
Dairy products
Milk-based drinks
Mint drinks
Ice cream drinks